Diplomatic and economic relations between Switzerland and Liechtenstein have been close, with Switzerland accepting the role of safeguarding the interests of its smaller neighbour, Liechtenstein.  Liechtenstein has an embassy in Berne. Switzerland is accredited to Liechtenstein from its Federal Department of Foreign Affairs in Berne and maintains an honorary consulate in Vaduz.

The two countries share an open border, mostly on the Rhine, but also in the Rätikon range of the Alps, between the Fläscherberg and the Naafkopf.

Cooperation
At the request of Liechtenstein's government in 1919, Switzerland safeguards Liechtenstein's interests and citizens abroad. The two countries form a common economic and monetary area. Liechtenstein has used the Swiss franc since 1920, and the two countries have formed a customs union since 1924, and have open borders. Both are now also parties to the Schengen Agreement. The countries also have a common patent system. Switzerland is empowered to enter into treaties on Liechtenstein's behalf if Liechtenstein is not represented at the treaty negotiations; this power has most often been exercised with treaties involving customs duties or procedures.

Swiss consular protection is extended to citizens of Liechtenstein. Switzerland represents Liechtenstein abroad unless they choose otherwise. Before Liechtenstein became a member in its own right of the European Free Trade Association, Switzerland represented its interests in that organization.

The two also share a common language, (German), and are both outside the European Union (Liechtenstein however has joined the European Economic Area). Like Switzerland, Liechtenstein maintains a policy of neutrality. However, whilst Switzerland follows a policy of armed neutrality, Liechtenstein does not have an army of its own. Ambassadors to one country are usually accredited to the other. The only resident ambassador in Liechtenstein is from the Sovereign Military Order of Malta.

Incidents involving the Swiss military

Switzerland has a relatively active military due to ongoing conscription. Several incidents have occurred during routine training:

On 14 October 1968, five Swiss artillery shells accidentally hit Liechtenstein's only ski resort, Malbun. The only recorded damages were to a few chairs belonging to an outdoor restaurant.
On 26 August 1976, just before midnight, 75 members of the Swiss Army and a number of packhorses mistakenly took a wrong turn and ended up 500 metres into Liechtenstein at Iradug, in Balzers. The Liechtensteiners reportedly offered drinks to the Swiss soldiers.
 On 5 December 1985, anti-aircraft missiles fired by the Swiss Army landed in Liechtenstein amid a winter storm, causing a forest fire in a protected area. Compensation was paid.
 On 13 October 1992, following written orders, Swiss Army recruits unknowingly crossed the border and went to Triesenberg to set up an observation post. Swiss commanders had overlooked the fact that Triesenberg was not on Swiss territory. Switzerland apologized to Liechtenstein for the incident.
 On 3 March 2007, a company of 171 Swiss soldiers mistakenly entered Liechtenstein, as they were disoriented and took a wrong turn due to bad weather conditions. The troops returned to Swiss territory after they had travelled more than 2 km into the country. The Liechtenstein authorities did not discover the incursion and were informed by the Swiss after the incident. The incident was disregarded by both sides. A Liechtenstein spokesman said, "It's not like they invaded with attack helicopters".

Taxation and tax treaties

Liechtenstein's standard rate of VAT (Mehrwertsteuer) is identical to Switzerland's for it must mirror the latter's continually and is currently 7.7%. The reduced rate is 2.5%. A special reduced rate of 3.7% is in use in the hotel industry.

In July 2015, both countries signed a new agreement on double taxation, which took effect in December 2016, superseding the previous one from 1995. Some differences on the withholding tax arose, but Switzerland did not agree to introduce this practice to residents of Liechtenstein working in Switzerland.

In November 2016, the parliament of the principality decided with a large majority to introduce an agreement of automatic information exchange with 27 new treaty partners, including Switzerland. Data collection started in 2018, and effectual exchange of account information in 2019.

See also
 Liechtenstein franc
 List of diplomatic missions in Liechtenstein
 Liechtenstein–EU relations 
 Switzerland–EU relations

References